Empress Wende may refer to:

Guo Nüwang (184–235), Cao Pi's empress during the Cao Wei dynasty
Empress Zhangsun (601–636), Emperor Taizong of Tang's empress